De Peyster (also spelled DePuyster) is a surname of Dutch origin. It is also a town, De Peyster, New York.

People
 Abraham de Peyster (1657–1728), the 20th Mayor of New York City from 1691 to 1694
 Abraham de Peyster (captain) (1753–1798), American Loyalist officer and Treasurer of New Brunswick
 Abraham de Peyster (treasurer) (1696–1767), treasurer of the province of New York
 Arent de Peyster (1736–1822), an American-born British loyalist military officer, commandant of the British controlled Fort Michilimackinac and Fort Detroit during the American Revolution
 Frederic de Peyster (1796–1882), New York City lawyer
 Frederic James de Peyster (1839–1905), prominent American soldier, lawyer, and member of New York Society during the Gilded Age
 Johannes de Peyster Sr. (1600–1685), a Dutch merchant who emigrated to New Amsterdam.
 Johannes de Peyster (1666–1719), the 23rd Mayor of New York City between 1698 and 1699
 Johannes de Peyster III (1694–1783), the Mayor of Albany who served three times between 1729 and 1742
 John Watts de Peyster (1821–1907), author on the art of war, philanthropist, and early Adjutant General of the New York National Guard
 John Watts de Peyster Jr. (1841–1873), soldier in the Union Army during the American Civil War
 Johnston de Peyster (1846–1903), soldier in the Union Army during the American Civil War, member of the New York State Assembly
 De Peyster Brown DFC (1915–1991), American fighter pilot who volunteered to fly for the British Royal Air Force in World War II
 James de Peyster Ogden (1790–1870), American merchant and businessman

See also
Watts De Peyster Fireman's Hall, located on Broadway in the village of Tivoli, New York, United States